Orville J. Rhodes, better known as Red Rhodes or O. J. Rhodes (December 30, 1930 – August 20, 1995), was an American pedal steel guitarist. His mother taught him to play the Dobro at the age of five, but at the age of fifteen he switched to the steel guitar. He was a boxer and an oil company engineer before he settled into music. He moved to Los Angeles in 1960 and became a session musician.

Rhodes played pedal steel on many country rock, pop and rock albums with The Monkees, Michael Nesmith, James Taylor, The Beach Boys, Seals and Crofts, The Byrds, The Carpenters, Spanky and Our Gang, and many other groups, as part of the Wrecking Crew studio musicians.  He is most often remembered for his work with former Monkee Michael Nesmith on Nesmith's solo albums in the early 1970s.  Rhodes is also credited with the "other-worldly" effects he created with pedal steel on The Ventures futuristic album The Ventures in Space in 1964.

In the late 1970s Rhodes shifted his focus from performing to guitar electronics at his Royal Amplifier Service shop in Hollywood, California.  There Rhodes modified amplifiers and created his custom Velvet Hammer guitar pickups for James Burton, Clarence White, and other influential guitarists.  His shop staff included future instrument makers David Schecter, Michael Tobias and Bill Chapin.

Rheumatoid arthritis restricted Rhodes' public performances and recordings in the 1980s and 1990s, with the notable exception of his appearance on Michael Nesmith's Tropical Campfires album and tour in 1992.  Rhodes fell ill soon after this tour, and died on August 20, 1995.

Discography

Solo projects
Once a Day and Other Steel Guitar Country & Western Favorites, 1961, Crown
Blue Blue Day and Other Steel Guitar Country & Western Favorites, 1962, Crown
Steel Guitar Rag and Other Country and Western Favorites, 1963, Crown
Red Rhodes Live at The Palomino, 1969, Happy Tiger
Velvet Hammer in a Cowboy Band, 1973, Countryside
Red Rhodes' Steel Guitar, 1979, Alshire
Fantastic Steel Guitar, 1980, Exact
Steel Guitar Favorites, 1990, Alshire

Session work
Skid Row Blues, Nothin', et al.''', 1963, Hal Ford Forrest D HalfordThe Ventures in Space, 1964, The VenturesBegin, 1968, The MillenniumNotorious Byrd Brothers, 1968, The ByrdsThe Wichita Train Whistle Sings, 1968, Michael NesmithBubblegum, Lemonade, and... Something for Mama, 1969, Cass ElliotInstant Replay, 1969, The MonkeesIt's Not Killing Me, 1969, Mike BloomfieldHand Sown ... Home Grown, 1969, Linda RonstadtNancy, 1969, Nancy SinatraWeeds, 1969, Brewer & ShipleyThe Blue Marble, 1969, SagittariusMagnetic South, 1970, Michael NesmithLoose Salute, 1970, Michael NesmithJohn Phillips (John, the Wolf King of L.A.), 1970, John PhillipsSweet Baby James, 1970, James TaylorTom Rush, 1970, Tom RushNevada Fighter, 1971, Michael NesmithPossum, 1971, PossumLead Free, 1972, B. W. StevensonOne Man Dog, 1972, James TaylorHold On Dear Brother, 1972 The Beach BoysRhymes and Reasons, 1972, Carole KingSon of Schmilsson, 1972, Harry NilssonA Song for You, 1972, The CarpentersSummer Breeze, 1972, Seals & CroftsTantamount to Treason, 1972, Michael NesmithAnd the Hits Just Keep on Comin', 1972, Michael NesmithWillis Alan Ramsey, 1972, Willis Alan RamseyFive & Dime, 1973, David AcklesPure Country, 1973, Garland FradyPretty Much Your Standard Ranch Stash, 1973, Michael NesmithValley Hi, 1973, Ian MatthewsThere's an Innocent Face, 1973, Curt BoettcherCalabasas, 1974, B. W. StevensonL.A. Turnaround, 1974, Bert JanschBlack Bach, 1974, Lamont DozierThe Prison, 1974,  Michael NesmithDiamonds & Rust, 1975, Joan BaezHorizon, 1975, The CarpentersMidnight on the Water, 1975, David BrombergMarriott, 1976, Steve MarriottSweet America, 1976, Buffy Sainte-MarieFrolicking in the Myth, 1977, Steven FromholzRoad Songs, 1977, Hoyt AxtonThe Way I Am, 1981, Billy PrestonTropical Campfires'', 1992,  Michael Nesmith

References

1930 births
1995 deaths
Pedal steel guitarists
Guitar pickup manufacturers
People from Alton, Illinois
Guitarists from Illinois
American country guitarists
American male guitarists
American session musicians
Deaths from pneumonia in California
20th-century American guitarists
Country musicians from Illinois
20th-century American male musicians
The First National Band members